Nogometni klub Čelik Zenica is a professional football club based in Zenica, Bosnia and Herzegovina. This chronological list comprises all those who have held the position of manager of the first team of NK Čelik Zenica from 1945 to the present day, where known.

List of managers

 Ernest Dubac (1958)
 Vlatko Konjevod (1959–60)
 Dušan Varagić (1968–69)
 Vlatko Konjevod (1969–70)
 Dušan Varagić (1970–71)
 Midhat Mujkić (1971–72)
 Dušan Varagić (1973)
 Dragoljub Milošević (1973–74)
 Marcel Žigante (1974–75)
 Alojz Renić (1975–78)
 Miladin Radičević (1978)
 Kemal Šestić (1978)
 Milan Ribar (1983–84)
 Dragutin Spasojević (1984)
 Vukašin Višnjevac (1985)
 Džemaludin Mušović (1985–86)
 Josip Skoblar (1988)
 Marijan Bloudek (1988–89)
 Fahrudin Jusufi (1989)
 Kemal Hafizović (1989–92)
 Nermin Hadžiahmetović (1992–96)
 Kemal Hafizović (1996–97)
 Jasmin Hajduk (1997)
 Josip Katalinski (1998)
 Husnija Arapović (1998–99)
 Omer Kopić (1999–00)
 Nermin Hadžiahmetović (2000–01)
 Kemal Hafizović (2001)
 Dino Đurbuzović (2001–03)
 Irfan Handžić (2003)
 Omer Kopić (interim) (2003)
 Kemal Hafizović (2003–04)
 Husnija Arapović (2004)
 Mehmed Čolak (interim) (2004)
 Husref Musemić (2004)
 Dino Đurbuzović (2004–05)
 Esher Hadžiabdić (2005)
 Jadranko Bajrić (2005)
 Omer Kopić (2005)
 Nelson Mourão (2005)
 Esher Hadžiabdić (2006)
 Kemal Hafizović (2006)
 Vjeran Simunić (2006)
 Boris Gavran (2006–07)
 Ivo Ištuk (2007–08)
 Marijan Bloudek (2008–09)
 Ivo Ištuk (2009)
 Omer Kopić (2009–10)
 Abdulah Ibraković (2010–11)
 Boris Gavran (2011)
 Elvedin Beganović (interim) (2011)
 Elvedin Beganović (2011–12)
 Amir Japaur (interim) (2012)
 Vlatko Glavaš (2012)
 Vlado Jagodić (2012–13)
 Nizah Hukić (interim) (2013)
 Nizah Hukić (2013–14)
 Milomir Odović (2014–15)
 Boris Pavić (2015)
 Elvedin Beganović (2015–16)
 Kemal Alispahić (2016)
 Ivo Ištuk (2016)
 Nedim Jusufbegović (2016–17)
 Boris Pavić (2017)
 Kemal Hafizović (2017)
 Elvedin Beganović (2017)
 Vinko Divković (2017)
 Slaven Musa (2018)
 Edin Prljača (2018)
 Adnan Örnek (2018–2019)
 Cihat Arslan (2019)
 Hasan Özer (2019)
 Almir Seferović (interim) (2019)
 Marko Babić (2019)
 Slaviša Božičić (2019)
 Igor Jović (interim) (2019)
 Ümit Özat (2019–2020)
 Pavle Skočibušić (2020–present)

References

External links
Manager history at Worldfootball.net

Manager
Celik
NK Cel
Lists of Bosnia and Herzegovina sportspeople